Pulchellidin (Pl) is an O-methylated anthocyanidin. It is a blue-red plant pigment. It can be found in Plumbago pulchella.

Glycosides
 Pulchellidin 3-rhamnoside (molecular formula : C22H23O11, exact mass : 463.124036578) is reported in Plumbago coerulea whereas pulchellidin 3-glucoside (C22H23O12, exact mass : 479.1189512) is reported in Plumbago pulchella

References

 

O-methylated anthocyanidins
Pyrogallols